The year 2023 is the 30th year in the history of the Ultimate Fighting Championship (UFC), a mixed martial arts promotion based in the United States.

Releases and retirements 
These fighters have either been released from their UFC contracts, announced their retirement or joined other promotions:

 Alejandro Pérez  - Released in January - Featherweight
 Brandon Davis - Released in January - Bantamweight
 Carlos Mota - Released in February - Flyweight
 Damir Ismagulov - Retired in January - Lightweight
Darren Till - Released in March - Middleweight
 Francis Ngannou - Released in January - Heavyweight
 Francisco Trinaldo - Released  in January - Welterweight
 Gadzhi Omargadzhiev - Released in January - Welterweight
 Glover Teixeira - Retired in January - Light Heavyweight
 Jay Perrin - Released in January - Bantamweight
 Jordan Wright - Released in February - Light Heavyweight
José Johnson - Released in March - Bantamweight
 Kevin Natividad - Released in January - Bantamweight
 Kyle Daukaus - Released in January - Middleweight
 Leah Letson - Retired in January - Women's Featherweight
 Lina Länsberg - Retired in February - Women's Bantamweight
 Liudvik Sholinian - Released in January - Bantamweight
 Marcelo Rojo - Released in January - Featherweight
 Maurício Rua - Retired in January - Light Heavyweight
 Michael Trizano  - Released in January - Featherweight
 Mike Jackson - Released in January - Welterweight
Raphael Assunção - Retired in March - Bantamweight
 Raulian Paiva  - Released in January - Bantamweight
 Saidyokub Kakhramonov - Released in January - Bantamweight
 Shamil Abdurakhimov - Released in January - Heavyweight
 Sijara Eubanks - Released in January - Women's Flyweight
 Victor Rodriguez - Released in January - Flyweight 
 Vince Morales - Released in January - Bantamweight
 Saidyokub Kakhramonov - Released in January - Bantamweight
 William Knight - Released in February - Light Heavyweight
Zubaira Tukhugov - Released in March - Featherweight

Debut UFC fighters 
The following fighters fought their first UFC fight in 2023:

 Anshul Jubli - UFC Fight Night 218
 Blake Bilder - UFC 284
 Brunno Ferreira - UFC 283
 Carl Deaton III - UFC Fight Night 220
 Choi Seung-guk - UFC Fight Night 218
 Claudio Ribeiro - UFC Fight Night 217
 Clayton Carpenter - UFC Fight Night 219
 Daniel Marcos - UFC 283
 Elves Brener - UFC 284
 Francisco Prado - UFC 284
 Gabriel Bonfim - UFC 283
 Gabriella Fernandes - UFC Fight Night 220
 Ismael Bonfim - UFC 283
 Jeka Saragih - UFC Fight Night 218
 Jack Jenkins - UFC 284
 Jamal Pogues - UFC Fight Night 219
 Jesús Santos Aguilar - UFC Fight Night 218
 Khusein Askhabov - UFC Fight Night 219
 Lee Jeong-yeong - UFC Fight Night 218
 Luan Lacerda - UFC 283 UFC 283
 Nick Aguirre - UFC Fight Night 217
 Nick Fiore - UFC Fight Night 217
 Nurullo Aliev - UFC Fight Night 220
 Mateus Mendonça - UFC Fight Night 217
 Mateusz Rębecki - UFC Fight Night 217
 Melquizael Costa - UFC 283
 Nazim Sadykhov - UFC Fight Night 219
 Park Hyun-sung - UFC Fight Night 218
 Rinya Nakamura - UFC Fight Night 218
 Shannon Ross - UFC 284
 Themba Gorimbo - UFC Fight Night 219
 Toshiomi Kazama - UFC Fight Night 218
 Trevor Peek - UFC Fight Night 220
 Victor Martinez - UFC Fight Night 220
 Yi Zha - UFC Fight Night 218
 Yusaku Kinoshita - UFC Fight Night 218

Suspended fighters 
The list below is based on fighters suspended either by (1) United States Anti-Doping Agency (USADA) or World Anti-Doping Agency (WADA) for violation of taking prohibited substances or non-analytical incidents, (2) by local commissions on misconduct during the fights or at event venues, or (3) by the UFC for reasons also stated below.

The Ultimate Fighter 
The following The Ultimate Fighter seasons are scheduled for broadcast in 2023:

Title fights

Events list

Scheduled events

Past events

See also 
 List of UFC champions
 List of UFC events
 List of current UFC fighters
 2023 in Bellator MMA
 2023 in ONE Championship
 2023 in Absolute Championship Akhmat
 2023 in Konfrontacja Sztuk Walki
 2023 in Rizin Fighting Federation
 2023 in Brave Combat Federation
 2023 in Legacy Fighting Alliance

References

External links 
 UFC past events on UFC.com
 UFC events results at Sherdog.com

Scheduled mixed martial arts events
Ultimate Fighting Championship by year
UFC